Discreet Cat is a thoroughbred race horse.  As a foal of 2003 (May 1), the bay colt won the UAE Derby in March 2006. He was then shipped to the United States, but did not race in the Kentucky Derby or any other Triple Crown races.

Connections
Discreet Cat is owned by Godolphin Stables. He was trained by Saeed bin Suroor and has been ridden by Javier Castellano, Frankie Dettori, and Garrett Gomez.

Breeding
Bred in Kentucky by E. Paul Robsham, Discreet Cat was sired by Forestry (by Storm Cat) out of Grade I winner Pretty Discreet (by Private Account).

His career earnings stand at $1,554,180.  His current stud fee is $30,000, he stands at Darley's Jonabell farm in Lexington, Ky.

Dubai World Cup
On March 31, 2007, Discreet Cat ran in the Dubai World Cup against U.S. Horse of the Year Invasor. He suffered his first career loss in seven starts as Invasor would go on to win the race while Discreet Cat finished last in a field of seven.

Following his loss in the Dubai World Cup, Discreet Cat's handlers announced an abscess had been found in the horse's throat. He did not return to racing until September 30, 2007 when he finished third in the Vosburgh Stakes at New York's Belmont Park.  His final race was a third-place finish in the inaugural Breeders' Cup Dirt Mile at Monmouth Park on October 26, 2007.

Races

Stud career

Discreet Cat currently stands as a stallion at Darley Stud in Japan.

Notable stock

Discreet Cat has currently sired four individual Group 1 winners:

c = colt, f = filly, g = gelding

References

 Discreet Cat's pedigree and photo
 NTRA bio
 Discreet Cat at Godolphin's official website
 2007 Dubai World Cup Video

2003 racehorse births
Racehorses bred in Kentucky
Racehorses trained in the United States
Racehorses trained in the United Arab Emirates
Thoroughbred family 2-n